Robert Jugler (fl. 1402–1414), of Chichester, Sussex, was an English politician.

He was a Member (MP) of the Parliament of England for Chichester in 1402, 1407, May 1413 and November 1414.

References

14th-century births
15th-century deaths
English MPs 1402
People from Chichester
English MPs 1407
English MPs May 1413
English MPs November 1414